Ženski košarkaški klub Vojvodina 021, commonly referred to as ŽKK Vojvodina 021, is a women's professional basketball club based in Novi Sad, Serbia. The club was founded in Beočin in 1999 as ŽKK Beočin, and was relocated to Novi Sad in 2018.

History
Founded in 1999 as ŽKK Beočin based in Beočin, the club relocated to Novi Sad in 2018, changing its name to ŽKK 021. On 25 September 2020, the club changed its name to ŽKK Vojvodina 021, continuing the tradition of the former club ŽKK Vojvodina.

In March 2021, the club lost in the final of National Cup.

Honours

Domestic
First League of Serbia:
Runners-up (1) : 2019

Serbian Cup
Runner up (1): 2021

References

External links
 Profile at eurobasket.com
 Profile at srbijasport.net

Vojvodina 021
Sport in Novi Sad
Basketball teams established in 1999
1999 establishments in Serbia
Beočin